Bempton Cliffs is a section of precipitous coast at Bempton in the East Riding of Yorkshire, England. It is run by the RSPB as a nature reserve and is known for its breeding seabirds, including northern gannet, Atlantic puffin, razorbill, common guillemot, black-legged kittiwake and fulmar. There is a visitor centre.

Location
The hard chalk cliffs at Bempton rise are relatively resistant to erosion and offer many sheltered headlands and crevices for nesting birds.

The area administered by the RSPB also includes Buckton Cliffs.

There are good walkways along the top of the cliffs and several well fenced and protected observation points.

Gannets
Bempton Cliffs is home to the only mainland breeding colony of gannets in England. The birds arrive at the colony from January and leave in August and September.

Kittiwakes
Numerically the most common bird, around 10% of the United Kingdom population of kittiwakes (Rissa tridactyla) nest here.

Puffins
The Atlantic puffins (Fratercula arctica) at Bempton Cliffs tend to nest in rock crevices, whereas burrows are used at most UK sites. Although there are estimated to be around 958 birds (450 breeding pairs), it is relatively difficult to get a close view of them. The puffins along the Yorkshire coast are now endangered.

Their numbers may however be adversely affected by a reduction in local sand eel numbers caused by global warming, in turn caused by plankton being driven north by the 2 degree rise in local sea temperatures.

References

External links 

 Bempton Cliffs Nature Reserve
 Information Britain entry
 Walks around Bempton Cliffs
 Travel Publishing information
 Yorkshire Coast Nature

Royal Society for the Protection of Birds reserves in England
RSPB visitor centres in England
Birdwatching sites in England
Cliffs of England
Protected areas of the East Riding of Yorkshire
Nature reserves in the East Riding of Yorkshire
Yorkshire coast